Afi Apeafa Woedikou (born 15 July 1994), known as Mafille Woedikou, is a Togolese footballer who plays as a forward for French Division 2 Féminine club FF Yzeure Allier Auvergne and the Togo women's national team.

Club career
Woedikou has played for Athléta FC in Togo and for ES Trois Cités Poitiers, AJ Auxerre and FF Yzeure Allier Auvergne in France.

International career
Woedikou capped for Togo at senior level during the 2022 Africa Women Cup of Nations qualification.

References

External links

1994 births
Living people
Sportspeople from Lomé
Togolese women's footballers
Women's association football forwards
Togo women's international footballers
Togolese expatriate footballers
Togolese expatriate sportspeople in France
Expatriate women's footballers in France